In the 1991 Intertoto Cup no knock-out rounds were contested, and therefore no winner was declared.

Group stage
The teams were divided into 9 groups of 4 teams and 1 group of 3 teams each. In two groups teams withdrew from the tournament before it finished.

Group 1

Group 2

Group 3

Group 4

Group 5

Group 6

 Olimpija Ljubljana withdrew during the tournament.

Group 7

Group 8

 Rot-Weiss Essen withdrew before the start of tournament.

Group 9

 Budućnost Titograd withdrew during the tournament.

Group 10

See also
 1991–92 European Cup
 1991–92 European Cup Winners' Cup
 1991–92 UEFA Cup

External links
  by Pawel Mogielnicki

1991
4
UEFA Intertoto Cup
UEFA Intertoto Cup